Cabo Engaño is the easternmost point of the island of Hispaniola, on the territory of the Dominican Republic.  Cape Engaño contains dangerous reefs near Santo Domingo. Punta Cana International Airport, the nation's busiest, lies slightly south of the cape.

In 1502, a large part of a Spanish fleet of 30-32 ships filled with treasures and colonists and other men bound for Spain sunk during a violent storm, somewhere close to Cape Engaño. This fleet was sent by order of governor Nicolas Ovando. 5-10 ships, although damaged, survived and returned to the port of departure, except for only one, the "Aguja", which safely reached Spain.

Climate

See also

 Lists of lighthouses and lightvessels

References

Capes of the Dominican Republic
Headlands of North America
Lighthouses in the Dominican Republic